Santa Cruz Island Airport  is a former airstrip on Santa Cruz Island in Santa Barbara County, California, United States. It is located 24 nautical miles (28 mi, 44 km) southwest of the City of Santa Barbara. This airport was owned by The Nature Conservancy but is no longer registered. It is not to be confused with Christy Airstrip  or Santa Cruz Ranch Airport , the currently active airstrips on Santa Cruz Island and also owned by The Nature Conservancy.

Facilities
Santa Cruz Island Airport resides at elevation of 50 feet (15 m) above mean sea level. It has one runway designated 9/27 with a dirt surface measuring 2,150 by 50 feet (655 x 15 m).

References

External links 
 Aerial image as of June 2002 from USGS The National Map
 

Airports in Santa Barbara County, California
Airports in California